Andrew or Andy Moore may refer to:

Politics
 Andrew Moore (politician) (1752–1821), U.S. Representative and Senator from Virginia
 Andrew B. Moore (1807–1873), governor of the U.S. state of Alabama

Sports
 Andy Moore (American football) (1902–1971), American football coach at the University of Chattanooga
 Andy Moore (footballer) (born 1965), English former professional soccer player
 Andrew Moore (Australian footballer) (born 1991), Australian footballer
 Andrew Moore (baseball) (born 1994), American baseball player
 Andy Moore (rugby union, born 1968), Wales international rugby union scrum-half
 Andy Moore (rugby union, born 1974), Wales international rugby union lock forward
 Andrew Moore (speedway rider) (born 1982), English speedway rider

Other
 Andrew Moore (historian), Australian academic and writer
 Andrew Moore (musician) (born 1979), electronic musician also known as A.M.
 Andy Moore (actor), English actor
 Andrew L. Moore (born 1957), American photographer
 Andrew M. T. Moore, archeologist at the Rochester Institute of Technology
 Andrew G. T. Moore II (1935–2018), American attorney and judge in Delaware

See also
Andy Moor (disambiguation)